George Ogan (born 20 July 1938) is a Nigerian athlete. He competed in the men's triple jump at the 1964 Summer Olympics.

References

External links
 

1938 births
Living people
Athletes (track and field) at the 1964 Summer Olympics
Nigerian male triple jumpers
Olympic athletes of Nigeria
Place of birth missing (living people)
Commonwealth Games medallists in athletics
Commonwealth Games silver medallists for Nigeria
Athletes (track and field) at the 1966 British Empire and Commonwealth Games
Athletes (track and field) at the 1970 British Commonwealth Games
20th-century Nigerian people
21st-century Nigerian people
Medallists at the 1966 British Empire and Commonwealth Games